Naveen Krishna is an Indian actor, director and writer based in Kannada Film Industry. After having starred in many films as a child actor, he made his adult debut in the film Shrirasthu Shubhamasthu (2000) and has since then acted in various films, mostly in supporting roles, in films such as Kadamba (2004), Nenapirali (2005), Dheemaku (2008) and Mathond Madhuvena (2011). His lead roles in the films, Haggada Kone (2014) and Actor (2016) won him several laurels and appreciations.

In 2013, Naveen announced that he would direct and script a film titled Lakshmi Bar which is yet to release. He did the co-direction for the film Bidalare Endu Ninna (2013).

Personal life 
Naveen was born in Bangalore, Karnataka to actor Srinivasa Murthy and Pushpa. He has three siblings of whom his brother Nitil Krishna is also a film actor. He has changed his screen name twice before as Akshay Krishna and later S. S. Krishna to try his luck according to the numerology. However he retained his original name after having found no satisfactory results.

Filmography

Television

He acted in Preethi Illada Mele and Nandagokula in ETV Kannada.

He acted as Hiranya Kashyapu in Shree Vishnu Dashavatara in Zee Kannada and Shree Vishnu Dashavataram in Zee Tamil in 2019.

As Director

References

External links 
 

Living people
Kannada film directors
Film directors from Bangalore
Male actors in Kannada cinema
Indian male film actors
Male actors from Bangalore
Indian male voice actors
Kannada playback singers
Indian male playback singers
20th-century Indian male actors
21st-century Indian male actors
Year of birth missing (living people)